The ATP Florence used to be a defunct men's tennis tournament that was played on the Rothman's Spring Mediterranean circuit in 1973, the Grand Prix tennis circuit from 1974 through 1989 and the ATP Tour 1990 through 1994. The tournament was held in Florence, Italy and was competed on outdoor clay courts. From 1973 through 1989, it was played in the weeks preceding the French Open; however, from 1990, it was played the week immediately after.

Italian Paolo Bertolucci won the event a record three consecutive times from 1975 through 1977, with clay court specialist Thomas Muster repeating the feat from 1991 through 1993.

The event was resumed in October 2022 as an ATP Tour 250 event with a single-year license due to the cancellation of tournaments in China because of the ongoing COVID-19 pandemic.

Results

Singles

Doubles

References

External links
 ATP Tour results archive
 ITF search

 
Grand Prix tennis circuit
Clay court tennis tournaments
Defunct tennis tournaments in Italy
ATP Tour